Stacey International is an independent publisher based at Catherine Place, in London. Founded in 1974 by Tom Stacey, the company aims to "maintain a resolute tradition of adaptive and imaginative publishing". The 1930s books were updated in 2010 by editor David Evans, an historian and former head of history at Eton College.

References

External links
 Home Page

Publishing companies of the United Kingdom